Sharad Pawar was sworn in as Chief Minister of Maharashtra for the fourth time on 6 March 1993. On appointment, Pawar formed a 18-member cabinet. The cabinet continued until the 1995 legislative elections, and was replaced by the Manohar Joshi ministry.

Government formation
Soon after the 1990 legislative elections, Pawar, then the incumbent Chief Minister, was sworn in once again. However, after 1991 Indian general election, Pawar resigned and was appointed Defence Minister by P. V. Narasimha Rao. He served as the Member of Parliament for Baramati at the same time. On his resignation, Sudhakarrao Naik was appointed the Chief Minister. However, in 1993, Pawar resigned as the nation's defence minister, and returned as the head of Maharashtra government.

List of ministers
The initial ministry consisted of:

Ministers of state
The junior ministers in the cabinet included:
 Marzban Patrawala, Finance and General Administration
 Ashok Chavan, Public Works, Urban Development, and Parliamentary Affairs
 Avinash Naik, Industries, Tourism, and Environment
 Arun Divekar, Youth Welfare and Sports
 Sadashivrao Dadoba Mandlik, Education, Employment Guarantee Scheme, Rehabilitation
 Eknath Gaikwad, Housing and Slum Development, Labour, and Social Welfare
 Manikrao Thakre, Home Affairs, Agriculture, and Rural Development
 Madhavrao Bhujangrao Kinhalkar, Revenue and Cooperation

References

Indian National Congress
1993 in Indian politics
Pawar
Nationalist Congress Party
Cabinets established in 1993
Cabinets disestablished in 1995